This page deals with the political organization founded in 1973. For the political party which preceded it, see Social-Democratic Party of Wisconsin.

The Socialist Party of Wisconsin (SPWI) is the state chapter of the Socialist Party USA in the U.S. state of Wisconsin. The Socialist Party had two locals, the Milwaukee County Local and the South Central Wisconsin Local.
 
The Socialist Party of America voted 73:34 to change its name to Social Democrats, USA in December 1972. SPUSA was founded in 1973, after which the SPWI was founded.

Notable office holders
The Socialist Party of Wisconsin sees itself as a continuation of the Social-Democratic Party of Wisconsin, state affiliate of the Socialist Party of America. This organization elected a number of candidates to office over the three-quarters of a century of its existence, including:

Municipal
 Emil Seidel, Mayor of Milwaukee, 1910-1912
 Daniel Webster Hoan, Mayor of Milwaukee, 1916-1940
 Frank Zeidler, Mayor of Milwaukee, 1948-1960
 George Lippert, District Attorney of Marathon County, 1918-1920 and from 1922 to 1924 as a Progressive La Follette Republican

Statewide

Federal
 Victor Berger, Member of the United States House of Representatives for Wisconsin's 5th district, 1911-1913 and 1922-1929

Notable members
 Diane Drufenbrock, Milwaukee resident and Socialist Party USA nominee for vice-president in 1980
 Angela Nicole Walker, Milwaukee resident and Socialist Party USA nominee for vice-president in 2016
 Frank Zeidler, Mayor of Milwaukee (1948-1960) and Socialist Party USA nominee for president in 1976

References

 

Political parties in Wisconsin
Wisconsin
Wisconsin